
Year 830 (DCCCXXX) was a common year starting on Saturday (link will display the full calendar) of the Julian calendar.

Events 
 By place 
 Britain 
 King Wiglaf of Mercia regains control from Wessex, and returns to the throne.

 Byzantine Empire 
 June 5 – Emperor Theophilos, 16,  marries the Armenian noblewoman Theodora, in the Hagia Sophia at Constantinople. He chooses her during a representation of a bride-show; she becomes empress (Augusta) of the Byzantine Empire.
 Byzantine–Arab War: Muslim reinforcements from Ifriqiya and Al-Andalus (modern Spain) defeat Byzantine forces under Theodotus in Sicily, but a plague once again compels them to retreat to Mazara del Vallo, and evacuate to North Africa.

 Europe 
 Emperor Louis the Pious returns from a campaign in Brittany, and is captured by his son Pepin I, king of Aquitaine. He is put under house arrest at Compiegne, and his wife Judith is incarcerated at Poitiers.

 North Africa 
 The Ad-dimnah Hospital (bimaristan) is created in Kairouan (modern Tunisia), by the Aghlabid emir Ziyadat Allah I.

 By topic 
 Religion 
 Nennius, Welsh abbot of Bangor Fawr, compiles the Historia Brittonum. He is also known for the Historia's list of the 12 battles of King Arthur (approximate date).
 Hirsau Abbey (modern Germany) is founded by the Rhenish Franconian count Erlafried of Calw (approximate date).
 Ansgar, a Frankish missionary, visits the trade city Birka, located at Lake Mälaren in Sweden (approximate date).

Births 
 Adalard, Frankish nobleman (approximate date)
 Athanasius I, bishop of Naples (d. 872)
 Carloman of Bavaria, Frankish king (or 828)
 Charles, Frankish bishop (or 825)
 Engelberga, Frankish empress (approximate date)
 Irmgard, Frankish abbess (or 833)
 Ishaq ibn Hunayn, Muslim physician (approximate date)
 Junayd of Baghdad, Muslim Sufi (d. 910)
 Kōkō, emperor of Japan (d. 887)
 Lambert III, Frankish nobleman (d. 882)
 Naum of Preslav, Bulgarian writer (approximate date)
 Robert the Strong, Frankish nobleman (approximate date)
 Rimbert, Frankish archbishop (d. 888)
 Rurik, prince of Novgorod (approximate date)
 Wulgrin I, Frankish count (approximate date)
 Yahya ibn Mu'adh al-Razi, Muslim Sufi (d. 871)
 Yunju Daoying, Chinese Buddhist teacher (d. 902)

Deaths 
 Æthelwold, bishop of Lichfield
 Ashot I, prince of Iberia (or 826)
 Eardwulf, king of Northumbria (approximate date)
 Egfrid, bishop of Lindisfarne
 Li Jiang, chancellor of the Tang Dynasty (b. 764)
 Sa'id ibn Aws al-Ansari, Muslim linguist
 Wang Jian, Chinese poet (approximate date)
 Zhang Ji, Chinese scholar and poet (approximate date)

References